Larry Levine (May 8, 1928 – May 8, 2008) was an American audio engineer, known for his collaboration with Phil Spector on the Wall of Sound recording technique.

Biography
Levine received the 1966 Grammy Award for Best Engineered Recording - Non-Classical, for the recording of "A Taste of Honey" performed by Herb Alpert & the Tijuana Brass. The recording also won the Grammy Award for Record of the Year in 1966.

Among his other known recording engineering contributions is the Beach Boys' influential 1966 album Pet Sounds.

Levine died of emphysema in Encino, California on his 80th birthday.

References

External links

1928 births
2008 deaths
20th-century American engineers
American audio engineers
Record producers from New York (state)
Deaths from emphysema